Stack Waddy is the first album by Stack Waddy, released in 1971 on Dandelion Records.

Critical reception

Music website Allmusic gave Stack Waddy four out of five stars. Reviewer Dave Thompson highlights this work as one of the "must hear" rock albums of the early 1970s; pointing out the brutal and uncompromising interpretations on many songs as one of the most striking features of the album. He ends his comment by saying that: "...this is one of those few albums that genuinely requires you to wear protective clothing".

Track listing
 "Roadrunner" – 3:26
 "Bring It to Jerome" – 5:18
 "Mothballs" – 3:35
 "Sure Nuff 'n Yes I Do" – 2:29
 "Love Story" – 2:19
 "Susie Q" – 2:27
 "Country Line Special" – 3:55
 "Rolling Stone" – 3:25
 "Mystic Eyes" – 6:05
 "Kentucky" – 2:42

Personnel

Musicians
John Knail - vocals, harmonica.
Steve Revell - drums, percussion.
Mick Stott - electric guitar.
Stuart Banham - bass guitar.

Production
 Eddie Lee Beppeaux, Miss Pig - producers.
 John Peel - executive producer. 
 George Borzyskowski - photography.

References

1971 debut albums
Stack Waddy albums
Dandelion Records albums